Guo Jiameimei (born August 16, 1991 in Harbin, Heilongjiang) is a Chinese former competitive ice dancer. She teamed up with partner Meng Fei in 2006. They placed 11th at the 2008 Four Continents Championships.

Programs
(with Meng)

Competitive highlights
(with Meng)

References

 

1991 births
Living people
Chinese female ice dancers
Figure skaters from Harbin
Competitors at the 2009 Winter Universiade